Göran Widenfelt (13 August 1928 – 9 March 1985) was a Swedish athlete. He competed in the men's high jump at the 1948 Summer Olympics and the men's decathlon at the 1952 Summer Olympics.

References

1928 births
1985 deaths
Athletes (track and field) at the 1948 Summer Olympics
Athletes (track and field) at the 1952 Summer Olympics
Swedish male high jumpers
Swedish decathletes
Olympic athletes of Sweden
Place of birth missing